Konika Rani Adhikary is a Bangladeshi badminton player and national champion. She is part of the Bangladesh National Badminton team and has represented Bangladesh in internationals tournaments.

Biography 
Konika Rani Adhikary won her first national title in 1996 against Sharmin Akthar Momo. She has won 15 titles in her career including seven times in mixed, six times in women's doubles and twice in singles. In 2005 she represented Bangladesh in Asian Badminton Confederation Championship. She participated in the Bajaj Discover Nepal International Series 2008 Badminton Championship in the mixed doubles event with fellow Bangladeshi Abdul Hannan. They lost to Balram Thapa and Pooja Shrestha of Nepal in the opening day of the tournament. She participated in the 11th South Asian Games but lost her match against Pakistani Tennis player Alina in January 2010. She beat Palwasha Basheer, from the Pakistan team in the 2010 South Asian Games, securing Bangladesh badminton team victory over the Pakistan national team, three to one in Bangladesh's favor. She was part of the 2010 badminton national squad of Bangladesh.

Sporting achievements

References 

Living people
Bangladeshi female badminton players
South Asian Games bronze medalists for Bangladesh
South Asian Games medalists in badminton
1979 births